Crime in Phoenix has been declining since the 1990s.

1960s–1970s

By the 1960s crime was becoming a significant problem in Phoenix, and by the 1970s crime continued to increase in the city at a faster rate than almost anywhere else in the country. It was during this time frame when an incident occurred in Phoenix which would have national implications. On March 16, 1963, Ernesto Miranda was arrested and charged with the rape of an 18-year-old woman with mild intellectual disabilities. The subsequent Supreme Court ruling on June 13, 1966, in the matter of Miranda v. Arizona, has led to practice in the United States of issuing a Miranda Warning to all suspected criminals.

By the mid 1970s, Phoenix was close to or at the top of the list for cities with the highest crime rate. The mayor during the mid-70s, Mayor Graham, introduced policies which raised Phoenix from near the bottom of the statistics regarding police officers per capita, to where it resided in the middle of the rankings. He also implemented other changes, including establishing a juvenile department within the police force. With Phoenix's rapid growth, it drew the attention of con men and racketeers, with one of the prime areas of activity being land fraud. The practice became so widespread that newspapers would refer to Phoenix as the Tainted Desert.

These land frauds led to one of the more infamous murders in the history of the valley, when Arizona Republic writer Don Bolles was murdered by a car bomb at the Clarendon Hotel in 1976. It was believed that his investigative reporting on organized crime and land fraud in Phoenix made him a target. Bolles' last words referred to Phoenix land and cattle magnate Kemper Marley, who was widely regarded to have ordered Bolles' murder, as well as John Harvey Adamson, who pleaded guilty to second-degree murder in 1977 in return for testimony against contractors Max Dunlap and James Robison.

The trial gained national attention since Bolles was the only reporter from a major U.S. newspaper to be murdered on U.S. soil due to his coverage of a story, and led to reporters from all over the country descending on Phoenix to cover his murder. Dunlap was convicted of first degree murder in the case in 1990 and remained in prison, until his death on July 21, 2009, while Robison was acquitted, but pleaded guilty to charges of soliciting violence against Adamson.

1980s–1990s
Street gangs and the drug trade had turned into public safety issues by the 1980s. Despite continued improvements in the size of the police force and other anti-crime measures, the crime rate in Phoenix continued to grow, albeit at a lower growth rate than other southwestern cities.

After seeing a peak in the early and mid 1990s, the city has seen a general decrease in both the violent and property crime rates. 1993 saw the creation of "Tent City," by Sheriff Joe Arpaio, using inmate labor, to alleviate overcrowding in the Maricopa County Jail system, the fourth-largest in the country. The violent crime rate peaked in 1993 at 1,146 crimes per 100,000 people, while the property crime rate peaked a few years earlier, in 1989, at 9,966 crimes per 100,000.

2000–present
In the most recent numbers from the FBI (2012), those rates currently stand at 637 and 4,091, respectively. When compared to the other cities on the 10 most populated list, this ranks Phoenix 5th and 6th, respectively. Since their peak in 2003, murders have dropped from 241 to 123 in 2012. Assaults have also dropped from 7,800 in 1993 to 5,260 in 2012. In the 20 years since 1993, there have only been five years in which the violent crime rate has not declined.

The year 2012 was an anomaly to the general downward trend in violent crime in Phoenix, with the rates for every single violent crime, except rape, showing an increase. The murder rate increased by 15.4% and aggravated assaults jumped by 27%, while rapes were down by 2%. However, the property crime rate returned to the downward trend begun in the 1990s, after a slight uptick in the previous two years. Vehicle thefts, which have been perceived as a major issue in the Valley of the Sun for decades, saw a continuation of a downward trend begun over a decade ago. In 2001 Phoenix ranked first in the nation in vehicle thefts, with over 22,000 cars stolen that year. That continued in 2002, when car thefts rose to over 25,000, a rate of over 1,825 thefts per 100,000 people. It has declined every year since then, and last year stood at just over 480, a drop of almost 75% in the decade. According to the "Hot Spots" report put out by the National Insurance Crime Bureau (NICB), The Phoenix MSA has dropped to 70th in the nation in terms of car thefts in 2012.

As the first decade of the new century came to a close, Arizona had become the gateway to the U.S. for drug trafficking. By 2009, seizures in Arizona amounted for approximately half of all Marijuana captured along the U.S.-Mexican border. Another crime issue related to the drug trade are kidnappings. In the late 2000s, Phoenix earned the title "Kidnapping capital of the USA". The majority of the kidnapped are believed to be victims of human smuggling, or related to illegal drug trade, while the kidnappers are believed to be part of Mexican drug cartels, particularly the Sinaloa cartel.

In August and September 2015, the Phoenix freeway shootings led to a number of cars being shot at on Interstate 10 in the city.

Between December 2020 to February 2021, the Piggy Bank Bandit robbed 6 banks in the Phoenix, Arizona area.

Statistics

References

Works cited
 
 

Phoenix
Phoenix, Arizona